Colin David Bremner (20 January 1920 — 13 June 2002) was an Australian first-class cricketer and Royal Australian Air Force officer.

Bremner was born in the Melbourne suburb of Hawthorn in January 1920. He served in the Australian Army during the Second World War, enlisting as a private in August 1940. He remained as a private in the army until his discharge in August 1941. He re-enlisted as a flight lieutenant in the Royal Australian Air Force in January 1942, serving in the maritime patrol No. 461 Squadron RAAF in Europe. Following the end of the war in Europe, Bremner represented the Dominions cricket team in a first-class cricket match against England at Lord's in August 1945; he notably twice stumped Wally Hammond in the match, but only after he had reached a century in each innings. He returned home to Australia with the Australian Services cricket team following the war, stopping off in Ceylon and British India on the homeward journey, where he appeared in three first-class matches for the team. Arriving in Australia in December 1945, Bremner represented the Australian Services in three further first-class matches against Western Australia, Victoria and Tasmania. Playing in seven first-class matches in all as a wicket-keeper, Bremner took 4 catches and made 6 stumpings, in addition to scoring 8 runs with the bat. Bremner later served in the Korean War, during which he was mentioned in dispatches in October 1952 for valuable service in the air. He died at Canberra in June 2002.

References

External links

1920 births
2002 deaths
Cricketers from Melbourne
Australian Army soldiers
Australian Army personnel of World War II
Royal Australian Air Force officers
Royal Australian Air Force personnel of World War II
Australian cricketers
Dominions cricketers
Australian Services cricketers
Australian military personnel of the Korean War
People from Hawthorn, Victoria
Military personnel from Melbourne